Aleksandrs Roge (19 April 1896 – 1945) was a Latvian footballer. He competed in the men's tournament at the 1924 Summer Olympics.

References

External links
 

1896 births
1945 deaths
Latvian footballers
Latvia international footballers
Olympic footballers of Latvia
Footballers at the 1924 Summer Olympics
Association football defenders
Footballers from Riga